Robert Patten may refer to:
 Robert Patten (Australian politician) (1859–1940), English-born Australian politician
 Robert W. Patten (1832–1913), American eccentric, known as the Umbrella Man
 Robert Patten (Jacobite chaplain), Jacobite chaplain and historian
 Robert L. Patten (1925–1994), American politician in the Georgia House of Representatives

See also
 Robert Paton (disambiguation)
 Robert M. Patton (1809–1885), American politician